Webster was a station on the Chicago Transit Authority's North Side Main Line, which is now part of the Brown Line. The station was located at 945 W. Webster Avenue in the Lincoln Park neighborhood of Chicago. Webster was situated south of Fullerton and north of Armitage. Webster opened on June 9, 1900, and closed on August 1, 1949, along with 22 other stations as part of a CTA service revision.

References

Defunct Chicago "L" stations
Railway stations in the United States opened in 1900
Railway stations closed in 1949
1900 establishments in Illinois
1949 disestablishments in Illinois